Badminton competitions at the 2022 Bolivarian Games in Valledupar, Colombia were held from 25 to 29 June 2022 at Coliseo Arena de Sal in Zipaquirá, a sub-venue in the Cundinamarca department.

Six medal events were scheduled to be contested; singles and doubles for men and women, mixed doubles and mixed teams. A total of 49 athletes (25 men and 24 women) competed in the events. The events were open competitions without age restrictions.

Peru, who were the competition defending champions after Santa Marta 2017, won the badminton competitions again after winning 5 of the 6 gold medals at stake.

Participating nations
A total of 9 nations (all the 7 ODEBO nations and 2 invited) registered athletes for the badminton competitions. Each nation was able to enter a maximum of 8 athletes (4 per gender).

Venue
The badminton competitions were held at the Coliseo Arena de Sal, in Zipaquirá, which has a capacity for 2,600 spectators. Badminton events were originally scheduled to be held at the Julio Villazón Baquero auditorium of the Fundación Colegio Bilingüe in Valledupar, and later at the Centro de Alto Rendimiento in Bogotá before moving to their final venue in Zipaquirá.

Medal summary

Medal table

Medalists

References

External links
Bolivarianos Valledupar 2022 Badminton

2022 in badminton
2022 Bolivarian Games
Badminton in Colombia
2022